Staphylococcus fleurettii is a Gram-positive, coagulase-negative member of the bacterial genus Staphylococcus consisting of single, paired, and clustered cocci. Strains of this species were originally isolated from raw-milk goat cheese.

References

External links
UniProt Taxonomy
Type strain of Staphylococcus fleurettii at BacDive -  the Bacterial Diversity Metadatabase

fleurettii
Bacteria described in 2000